Saidani Ma Tomb, also spelt Saidani Maa Tomb, is a tomb located in Hyderabad, India. It is a state protected monument of Telangana.

It is located near Hussain Sagar.

The tomb in Mughal and Qutb Shahi styles with elaborate stucco decorations and fretwork screens (jalis) was built by Nawab Abdul Haq Diler Jung for his mother Hazrath Saidani Ma Saheba in 1883, during the reign of Asaf Jah VI.

The 131-year old heritage structure is in need of restoration. The plaster on the dome and walls is peeling off leaving black patches.

See also 
 Qutb Shahi tombs
 Paigah Tombs

References 

Buildings and structures completed in 1883
Heritage structures in Hyderabad, India
Monuments and memorials in Hyderabad, India